Rötelbach may refer to:

 Rötelbach (Danube), a river of Baden-Württemberg, Germany, tributary of the Danuber
 Rötelbach (Jagst), a river of Baden-Württemberg, Germany, tributary of the Jagst